New Hope is an unincorporated area and census-designated place (CDP) in Wayne County, North Carolina, United States. It was first listed as a CDP in the 2020 census with a population of 1,588.

The CDP is in eastern Wayne County, bordered to the west by the city of Goldsboro, the county seat. It is bordered to the north by Old Mill Branch and West Bear Creek, which flows east to Bear Creek and then south to the Neuse River. It is bordered to the south by the EC Line of the North Carolina Railroad. The main road through the community is East New Hope Road, which leads west  to U.S. Route 13 in Goldsboro and southeast  to Best.

Demographics

2020 census

Note: the US Census treats Hispanic/Latino as an ethnic category. This table excludes Latinos from the racial categories and assigns them to a separate category. Hispanics/Latinos can be of any race.

References 

Census-designated places in Wayne County, North Carolina
Census-designated places in North Carolina